The following is a list of squads for each national team that competed at the 2015 UEFA European Under-17 Championship in Bulgaria. Each national team had to submit a squad of 18 players born after 1 January 1998.

Players in boldface have been capped at full international level at some point in their career.

Group A

Austria 
Head coach:  Manfred Zsak

Source:

Bulgaria
Head coach:  Aleksandar Dimitrov

Source:

Croatia 
Head coach: Dario Bašić

1. Adrian Zenko was called up during the tournament due to an injury to Martin Erlić.

Spain 
Head coach:  Santiago Denia

Group B

Belgium 
Head coach:  Bob Browaeys

Source:

Czech Republic 
Head coach:  Václav Černý

Source:

Germany 
Head coach:  Christian Wück

1. Vitaly Janelt was called up during the tournament due to an injury to Niklas Dorsch.

Source:

Slovenia 
Head coach:  Igor Benedejčič

 

Source:

Group C

France 
Head coach:  Jean-Claude Giuntini

 

Source:

Greece 
Head coach:  Vassilis Georgopoulos

Russia 
Head coach:  Mikhail Galaktionov

Scotland 
Head coach:  Scot Gemmill

 

Source:

Group D

England
Head coach:  John Peacock

Italy
Head coach:  Bruno Tedino

Netherlands
Head coach:  Maarten Stekelenburg

 

Source:

Republic of Ireland
Head coach:  Tom Mohan

 

Source:

References

External links
Squads on UEFA.com

Squads
UEFA European Under-17 Championship squads